The 1988 FIBA European Champions Cup Final Four was the concluding tournament of the 1987–88 FIBA European Champions Cup, and the first one with the new FIBA European Champions Cup Final Four format, since the 1967 FIBA European Champions Cup Final Four.

Tracer Milano won its third title.

Bracket

Semifinals 
All times are CEST (UTC+2).

Partizan – Maccabi Elite Tel Aviv

Aris – Tracer Milano

Third-place game

Final

Awards

FIBA European Champions Cup Final Four MVP 
 Bob McAdoo ( Tracer Milano)

FIBA European Champions Cup Finals Top Scorer 
 Bob McAdoo ( Tracer Milano)

External links 
Boxscores at Euroleague.net
Linguasport

1987–88 in European basketball
1988–89
1988 in Belgian sport
1987–88 in Greek basketball
1987–88 in Italian basketball
1987–88 in Israeli basketball
1987–88 in Yugoslav basketball
International basketball competitions hosted by Belgium
Sports competitions in Ghent
20th century in Ghent